(Triphenylphosphine)iron tetracarbonyl is a coordination complex with the formula Fe(CO)4(PPh3) (Ph = C6H5).  An off-white solid, this complex is derived from iron pentacarbonyl by replacement of one carbonyl ligand by triphenylphosphine (PPh3).

Synthesis and use
The title complex can be prepared by reaction of iron pentacarbonyl or triiron dodecacarbonyl with triphenylphosphine:

The substitution is catalyzed by cobalt chloride. 

(Triphenylphosphine)iron tetracarbonyl is an intermediate in the synthesis of bis(triphenylphosphine)iron tricarbonyl. Both the mono- and bis(triphenylphosphine) complexes were originally employed in pioneering research on homogeneous catalysis by Walter Reppe.

References

Triphenylphosphine complexes
Coordination complexes
Carbonyl complexes
Iron compounds